Calliope School of Legal Studies is a private law school situated beside Jammu-Akhnoor Highway, Gandhi Nagar in Jammu in the Indian union territory of Jammu and Kashmir. It offers undergraduate 3 years law courses, 5 Year Integrated LL.B. courses, approved by Bar Council of India (BCI), New Delhi and affiliated to University of Jammu. Calliope School of Legal Studies was established in 2005.

References

Educational institutions established in 2005
2005 establishments in Jammu and Kashmir
Education in Jammu (city)
Law schools in Jammu and Kashmir